
Year 237 BC was a year of the pre-Julian Roman calendar. At the time it was known as the Year of the Consulship of Caudinus and Flaccus (or, less frequently, year 517 Ab urbe condita). The denomination 237 BC for this year has been used since the early medieval period, when the Anno Domini calendar era became the prevalent method in Europe for naming years.

Events 
 By place 
 Carthage 
 Hamilcar Barca's success in defeating the mercenaries results in a growth in his strength as leader of Carthage's popular party and support for his proposed invasion of the Iberian Peninsula. However, as spokesman for the landed nobility, Hanno opposes the policy of foreign conquest pursued by Hamilcar Barca.
 Nevertheless, Hamilcar Barca leads a Carthaginian army in an invasion of the Iberian Peninsula with the aim of building a base from which war with Rome can be renewed. By skillful generalship and able diplomacy, Hamilcar extends Carthaginian dominion over many Spanish tribes.

 China 
 Lü Buwei is deposed as the Prime Minister of Qin.
 The Qin official and philosopher Li Si persuades the king, Ying Zheng, not to expel foreign officers with his "Petition against the Expulsion of Guest Officers" (Jianzhuke Shu).

Births

Deaths 
 Xun Zi, Confucian philosopher who has contributed to one of the Hundred Schools of Thought (b. c. 310 BC)

References